Statistics of Portuguese Liga in the 1985/1986 season.

Overview
It was contested by 16 teams, and F.C. Porto won the championship.

League standings

Results

Season statistics

Top goalscorers

Footnotes

External links
 Portugal 1985-86 - RSSSF (Jorge Miguel Teixeira)
 Portuguese League 1985/86 - footballzz.co.uk
 Portugal - Table of Honor - Soccer Library 
 Portuguese Wikipedia - Campeonato Português de Futebol - I Divisão 1985/1986

Primeira Liga seasons
1985–86 in Portuguese football
Portugal